Beaver Local High School is a public high school near East Liverpool, Ohio, United States. It is the only secondary school in the Beaver Local School District, and serves the communities of Calcutta, Lake Tomahawk, and Rogers in southeastern Columbiana County, as well as parts of surrounding Elkrun, Madison, Middleton, and St. Clair townships. Athletic teams compete as the Beaver Local Beavers in the Ohio High School Athletic Association as a member of the Buckeye 8 Athletic League as well as the Ohio Valley Athletic Conference.

History

On November 19, 1934, the Columbiana County Board of Education passed a resolution establishing the Beaver Local Rural School District. The district was a consolidation of seven existing rural school districts at that time. The district was named after the Little Beaver Creek, which runs through most of the district. Later, the name was changed to the Beaver Local School District.

The high school was established in 1956, and constructed on ground in the middle of the district, in Madison Township. It opened to about 400 students from both district grade schools as well as the nearby high schools of David Anderson, East Liverpool, and East Palestine. The school colors of red and white were chosen by the Board of Education. The first class graduated in 1959 with 70 students.

In 2015, a new K–12 campus was constructed next to the former middle school site, moving the school just over the border into St. Clair Township.

Academics
According to the National Center for Education Statistics, in 2019, the school reported an enrollment of 499 pupils in grades 9th through 12th, with 496 pupils eligible for a federal free or reduced-price lunch. The school employed 28.00 teachers, yielding a student–teacher ratio of 17.82.

Beaver Local High School offers courses in the traditional American curriculum. Most course sequences are either on an Advanced Placement track, postsecondary oriented track, or career oriented track. Advanced Placement courses are available in calculus AB, English literature, English language, U.S. government, and U.S. history. The high school offers a dual enrollment program where high school students take courses at or through local higher education institutions, to earn college credits while they remain enrolled at the high school. Partnerships are offered with Eastern Gateway Community College, Kent State University at East Liverpool, and Youngstown State University, with courses at the high school available in English, technology, and business, and select courses at the university campuses also eligible.

Entering their third and fourth years, students can elect to attend the Columbiana County Career and Technical Center in Lisbon as either a part time student, taking core courses at BLHS, while taking career or technical education at the career center, or as a full time student instead. Students may choose to take training in automotives, construction technology, cosmetology, culinary arts, health sciences, information technology, multimedia, landscape & environmental design, precision machining, veterinary science, and welding.

A student must earn 28 credits to graduate, including: 4 credits in a mathematics sequence, 3 credits in science, including life and physical science, 4 credits in English, 3 credits in a social studies sequence, 1 credit in fine art, 1 credit in health and physical education, 1 credit in personal finance, and 4.5 elective credits. Elective courses can be in English, science, social studies, foreign language, technology and business, family and consumer science, and fine art. Students attending the career center follow the same basic requirements, but have requirements in career & technical education rather than fine arts. All students must pass Ohio state exams in English I & II, Algebra I, Geometry, Biology, American History, and American Government, or the like.

Athletics
Beaver Local High School has been a member of the Ohio Valley Athletic Conference since 1991, and the related Buckeye 8 Athletic League since 2013. They were also part of the Buckeye Border Conference (1961-1974), Tri-County League (1974-1976),  River Valley Conference (1990-1999), and All-American Conference (2008-2013). The high school fields sports teams in baseball, basketball, bowling, cross country running, football, golf, soccer, softball, swimming, tennis, track and field, volleyball and wrestling.

OVAC Conference Championships
Boys Basketball - 2004
Girls Basketball - 2019
Football - 2000
Golf - 2020
Girls Soccer - 2004, 2006
Softball - 2001
Volleyball - 2002, 2006, 2007, 2016, 2020
Wrestling - 1997, 2019, 2020

Buckeye 8 Conference Championships
Boys Swimming - 2016
Girls Soccer - 2015, 2016, 2017
Boys Soccer - 2018
Volleyball - 2015, 2016
Wrestling - 2015, 2016, 2017, 2018, 2019
Football- 2021

Athletic facilities
The Mangano Athletic Complex is the primary facility for weightlifting and training for all sports. Pastore Field at Fighting Beaver Stadium, just south of the high school, is used for football and soccer games. A gymnasium inside the school is used for basketball, volleyball, and wrestling. In addition, there are baseball, softball, and soccer fields, tennis courts, and a track on campus. Off-campus facilities include the YMCA for swimming, Tri-State Lanes for bowling, Beaver Creek Meadows Golf Course for boys golf, and Turkana Golf Course for girls golf.

Notable alumni
Derek Wolfe - former professional football Defensive End in the National Football League who played for the Denver Broncos and Baltimore Ravens.

External links
 District Website

Notes and references

High schools in Columbiana County, Ohio
East Liverpool, Ohio
Public high schools in Ohio
1958 establishments in Ohio